This is an annotated list of records of the Philippines organized by category.

Finance
Wealthiest individual person (Forbes' The World's Billionaires list): Manny Villar, with a net worth of $7.2 billion (₱349.7 billion) in 2021. (352nd in the world)

Geography

 The tallest mountain: Mount Apo, Mindanao, 
 The largest lake: Laguna de Bay, Luzon,  surface area
 The largest island: Luzon, 

 The longest river: Cagayan River, Cagayan Valley. 
 The longest underground river: Puerto Princesa Underground River, Palawan,  cave containing an  underground section of the Cabayugan River
 The highest temperature (as officially recorded by the PAGASA): Tuguegarao, Cagayan, April 29, 1912 and May 11, 1969
 The lowest temperature (as officially recorded by the PAGASA): Baguio, January 18, 1961
 The strongest earthquake: 1976 Moro Gulf earthquake, Mw 8.0, August 16, 1976
 The deadliest earthquake: 1976 Moro Gulf earthquake, 4,791 deaths, August 16, 1976

Political entities

 Area
 Largest province: Palawan (excluding Puerto Princesa), 
 Smallest province: Batanes, 
 Largest city: Davao City,  (20th largest in the world)
 Smallest city: San Juan, 
 Largest municipality: Sablayan, Occidental Mindoro, 
 Smallest municipality: Pateros, 

 Population
 Province with the largest population:
 excluding highly urbanized cities: Cavite, 3,678,301 inhabitants (2015)
 including highly urbanized cities: Cebu, 4,632,359 inhabitants (2015)
 Province with the smallest population: Batanes, 17,246 inhabitants (2015)
 City with the largest population: Quezon City, 2,936,116 inhabitants (2015)
 City with the smallest population: Palayan, Nueva Ecija, 41,041 (2015)
 City outside Metro Manila with the largest population: Davao City, 1,632,991 inhabitants (2015)
 Municipality with the largest population: Rodriguez, Rizal, 369,222 (2015)
 Municipality with the smallest population:
 disputed territory: Kalayaan, Palawan, 184 inhabitants (2015)
 undisputed: Ivana, Batanes, 1,327 inhabitants (2015)
 Barangay with the largest population: Barangay 176, Caloocan, 246,515 (2015)

 Population density
 Province with highest population density: Cavite  (2015)
 Province with lowest population density: Apayao  (2015)
 City with highest population density: Manila,  (2015)
    
 City with lowest population density: Puerto Princesa,  (2015)
    
 City outside Metro Manila with highest population density: Mandaue,  (2015)
 Municipality with highest population density: Cainta, Rizal,  (2015)
    
 Municipality with lowest population density:
 disputed territory: Kalayaan, Palawan,  (2015)
    
 undisputed: Dinapigue, Isabela,  (2015)
    

 Number of barangays
 Province with most barangays: Iloilo, 1,721
 Province with fewest barangays: Batanes, 29
 City with most barangays: Manila, 897
 City with fewest barangays: Muntinlupa, 9
 Municipality with most barangays: Miagao, Iloilo, 119
 Municipality with fewest barangays:
 disputed territory: Kalayaan, Palawan, 1
 undisputed: Adams, Ilocos Norte, 1

 Foundation date
    
 Oldest city: Cebu City, founded 1565

Buildings and structures

 The tallest building: Grand Hyatt Manila, Taguig, Metro Manila, 
 The tallest twin building: One Shangri-La Place Towers, Mandaluyong, Metro Manila,  (17th tallest in the world)
 Largest shopping mall by gross leasable area: SM City North EDSA, Quezon City, Metro Manila,  (7th largest in the world)
 Tallest bamboo statue: St. Vincent Ferrer Statue, Bayambang, Pangasinan,  (also tallest in the world)

Others
 Shortest man: Junrey Balawing,  (was also shortest living person in the world)
 Largest serving of balut: Pateros, .
 Largest attended papal gathering: Mass by Pope Francis in Rizal Park, Manila on January 18, 2015, attended by 6–7 million people (also largest in the world)
 Largest banknote: ₱100,000 bill, launched in 1998, dimensions of 356mm width and 216mm height
 Largest gong ensemble in the world, which was participated by 3,440 people in Tabuk, Kalingan on February 2023 
 Largest banga dance in the world, which was participated by 4,681 people in Tabuk, Kalinga on February 2023. The dance uses ‘bangas’ or clay pots, which is used to carry water and balanced in the head.

See also
List of firsts in the Philippines
List of Filipino records in athletics
List of Filipino records in Olympic weightlifting
List of Filipino records in swimming
List of Filipino records in track cycling

Notes

References

Philippines-related lists of superlatives